DSST (formerly DANTES Subject Standardized Tests) are credit-by-examination tests originated by the United States Department of Defense's Defense Activity for Non-Traditional Education Support (DANTES) program. The program is an extensive series of 33 examinations in college subject areas that are comparable to the final or end-of-course examinations in undergraduate college courses. These tests are frequently used in conjunction with CLEP (College Level Examination Program) tests by students pursuing college degrees in non-traditional formats.  Whereas CLEP tests are almost exclusively used for lower level credit at regionally accredited institutions, DSST's are available for both upper and lower level credit.

Prometric administers Internet-based versions of DSSTs under contract with the Defense Department (for military personnel) or on a fee basis (for civilians).

List of tests
(Test Form Number) (Title) (Credit Amount in Semester Hours) (Minimum Score (Scaled score))

Mathematics
SI/SO 424 Fundamentals of College Algebra 3B 400 Criterion-based
SI/SO 450 Principles of Statistics 3B 400 Criterion-based

Social Science
SN/SP 461 Art of the Western World 3B 400 
SN/SP 470 Human/Cultural Geography 3B 400 
SN/SP 471 History of the Soviet Union (Formerly Rise and Fall of the Soviet Union) 3BU 400 
SN/SP 473 A History of the Vietnam War 3BU 400 
SE/SF 483 The Civil War and Reconstruction 3BU 400 
SN/SP 489 Foundations of Education 3B 400 
SN/SP 490 Lifespan Developmental Psychology 3B 400 
SN/SP 494 General Anthropology 3B 400 
SN/SP 495 Substance Abuse (Formerly Drug and Alcohol Abuse) 3BU 400 
SN/SP 497 Introduction to Law Enforcement 3BU 400 
SI/SO 498 Criminal Justice 6B 400  
SN/SP 562 Fundamentals of Counseling 3B 400

Business
SI/SO 524 Principles of Finance 3BU 400 
SN/SP 530 Human Resource Management 3B 400 
SN/SP 531 Organizational Behavior 3B 400 
SN/SP 532 Principles of Supervision 3B 400 
SN/SP 536 Introduction to Computers 3B 400 
SN/SP 543 Introduction to Business 3B 400 
SN/SP 548 Money and Banking 3BU 400 
SE 550 Personal Finance 3B 400 
SN/SP 551 Management Information Systems 3B 400 
SI/SO 812 Business Mathematics 3B 400 
SI/SO 475 Business Ethics and Society 3BU 400

Physical Science
SN/SP 500 Astronomy 3B 400 
SN/SP 508 Health & Human Development (Formerly Here's to Your Health) 3B 400 
SN/SP 511 Environment and Humanity: The Race to Save the Planet 3B 400 
SN/SP 512 Principles of Physical Science I 3B 400

Technology
SN/SP 820 Technical Writing 3B 400 
SN/SP 013 Fundamentals of Cyber Security 3BU 400

Humanities
SN/SP 474 Ethics in America 3B 400 
SN/SP 496 Introduction to World Religions 3B 400 
SE 815* Principles of Public Speaking 3B 400 
In addition to a minimum score of 400 on the multiple-choice test, an examinee must also receive a passing grade on the speech which is graded separately.

B = Baccalaureate Program | BU = Baccalaureate Upper Division

See also
CLEP Tests
GRE Subject Tests

References

External links
 US Defense Department DSST website for military personnel
 Get College Credit DSST Website

Standardized tests in the United States